Joseph Anthony Amabile (born April 12, 1986) is an American reality television personality. He is best known for his appearances on The Bachelorette and Bachelor in Paradise.

Early life and education 
Amabile was born on April 12, 1986, in Chicago, Illinois, to an Italian father and a Norwegian mother. He attended Holy Cross High School. He has one brother.

Career 
Amabile was a co-owner of Eric's Food Center in Chicago, Illinois, which earned him the nickname "Grocery Store Joe" when he appeared on The Bachelorette.

He hosts a podcast with Natasha Parker and Tia Booth called Click Bait with Bachelor Nation.

The Bachelorette 

Amabile was a contestant on Becca Kufrin's season of The Bachelorette. He was eliminated night 1.

Bachelor in Paradise 

Amabile appeared on season 5 of Bachelor in Paradise in 2018. He split from his partner Kendall Long week 5. They got back together after filming wrapped and were together until January 2020. He returned for season 7 of Bachelor in Paradise in 2021. He proposed to Serena Pitt in the finale.

Dancing with the Stars 

Amabile was announced as one of the celebrities to compete on season 27 of Dancing with the Stars. He was partnered with professional dancer Jenna Johnson. During week 4, another The Bachelorette cast member, Jordan Kimball, appeared in their dance for Trio's Night. They were eliminated on November 12, 2018, tying for 5th place. They performed their Trio Night routine in the finale with Jenna's husband Valentin Chmerkovskiy taking Jordan's place. Other Bachelor Nation alums danced with them as well including Wells Adams, Nick Viall, Eric Bigger, and Dean Unglert.

Personal life 
Amabile was in a relationship with Kendall Long from July 2018 to January 2020.

Amabile got engaged to Serena Pitt on June 26, 2021. They moved to New York City together in April 2022. They got married on October 27, 2022.

References 

1986 births
Living people
Bachelor Nation contestants